The Hertie School (until 2019 Hertie School of Governance) is a German private, independent graduate school for governance (public policy, international affairs and data science) located in Berlin's Friedrichstraße. Hertie School is according to the QS rankings, ranked as one of the most prestigious public policy schools in the world. 
It is accredited to confer master's and doctoral degrees. Half of the students in the Hertie School come from abroad, with more than 95 countries represented among alumni and currently enrolled students. The working language is English.

The research focus of the Hertie School, which has existed since its founding, lies in the analysis of the conditions, structures and dynamics of governance.

Since 2018, the Hertie School has established five research centres (Centres of Competence) that focus on future key governance challenges: the Centre for International Security, the Centre for Digital Governance, the Centre for Fundamental Rights, the Jacques Delors Centre and the Centre for Sustainability (from 2021). Additionally, the School's Data Science Lab uses research in data science and artificial intelligence (AI) to tackle major societal problems.

History
The Hertie School was founded by the Hertie Foundation, located in Frankfurt. The school was established in 2003 as one of the first European professional schools for public policy. Since 2008 it has been located in the Quartier 110 building on Friedrichstrasse in Berlin. The first study program offered was the Master of Public Policy (MPP). In 2015, the Master of International Affairs (MIA) was added. The Master of Data will be set up in 2021.

In February 2005, the Hertie School was awarded state recognition as college of higher education by the Berlin Ministry of Science, Research, and Culture (Senatsverwaltung für Wissenschaft, Forschung und Kultur). The work of the Hertie School is based on four pillars: Research, Degree Programmes (Master of Public Policy, Master of International Affairs, Executive Master of Public Administration, Master of Data Science for Public Policy (from September 2021), and the Berlin School for Transnational Studies), Executive Education, and Knowledge Transfer.

In October 2017, the Hertie School once again received full accreditation to confer doctoral degrees for another ten years.

In February 2019, the Hertie School announced that it would move to the Robert Koch Forum from summer 2025 to enable its growth plans. The historic Robert Koch Forum is currently being renovated by the city of Berlin with a budget of 87 million euros.

Enrollment and Degrees
As of September 2020, a total of 687 students were enrolled in the school. This includes 539 master's students, 51 Executive MPA participants and 63 doctoral students. There are over 2,100 alumni.

Predominantly, Hertie School's students have backgrounds in law, economics, political science and international relations and pursue a Master of Public Policy, Master of International Affairs or Master of Data Science for Public Policy degree. The school offers its students the opportunity to complete a "professional year" at a multinational corporation, government ministry or an international organization. In addition to this possibility, research collaboration with faculty is encouraged. The Hertie School also offers an Executive Masters of Public Administration.

Academic programmes
The Hertie School currently offers three Master programmes, an executive Master, and a PhD programme.

The Master of Public Policy (MPP) programme offers teaching on corporate relations & government affairs in the public, civil society and private sectors. The programme is intended for students pursuing a future career dealing professionally with problems of modern governance, international relations, advanced economics and politics. Upon completion of the two-year programme, students receive the Master of Public Policy (MPP). Prospective students have typically studied economics, law or political science, but candidates from every field of study apply for admission.

The Master of International Affairs (MIA) programme, a two-year-programme added in autumn 2015, focuses on three concentration areas: International Security, European Governance and Human Rights and Global Governance. MIA students choose their specialisation during the second semester of their studies, allowing more time to develop expertise in their chosen field. The programme prepares students for positions requiring a profound understanding of today's global policy challenges.

The School also offers a Master of Data Science for Public Policy (MDS) programme as of September 2021. The MDS combines the world of public policy with data science. In this programme, students learn how to tackle challenges of government, civil society, and business with data-driven solutions.

The Executive Master of Public Administration (Executive MPA) programme is aimed at experienced professionals for whom cooperation between government, business and civil society is an important part of their work. Participants in the Executive MPA programme choose an individual area of concentration and can either study full-time over a period of one year or complete the programme over a period of two years if they wish to study part-time while working. Prospective students must have at least two years' professional work experience, as well as an educational background in economics, law or social sciences. Executive MPA has exchange programmes with the ESCP Europe, the Copenhagen Business School and the University of Bern.

The Hertie School also offers a PhD study programme as part of the Berlin Graduate School for Transnational Studies (BTS), a joint endeavour of the Free University of Berlin (FUB), the Hertie School and the WZB Berlin Social Science Center.

In autumn 2012, the Hertie School welcomed its first PhD cohort. PhD candidates take core curriculum courses in their first year while beginning their dissertation research and are expected to complete their PhDs within three years.

Student life
Students of the Hertie School are engaged with a number of student clubs, including the students’ magazine The Governance Post, the Diplomacy Club, the Latin America Club, the Pride Network, Cinema Politica, The Work, Economy & Social Policy Club, and many more.

Faculty
Members of the core faculty include President Cornelia Woll, Dean Mark Hallerberg, Dean Andrea Römmele, Dean Christine Reh, Helmut K. Anheier, Joanna Bryson, Başak Çalı, Luciana Cingolani, Cathryn Costello, Mark Dawson, Ruth Ditlmann, Christian Flachsland, Anita Gohdes, Lukas Graf, Gerhard Hammerschmid, Anke Hassel, Marina Henke, Lion Hirth, Klaus Hurrelmann, Thurid Hustedt, Wolfgang Ischinger, Markus Jachtenfuchs, Slava Jankin, Lynn Kaack, Mark Kayser, Michaela Kreyenfeld, Johanna Mair, Sébastien Mena, Alina Mungiu-Pippidi, Simon Munzert, Arianna Ornaghi, Mujaheed Shaikh, Daniela Stockmann, Christian Traxler, Kai Wegrich and Julian Wucherpfennig.

Partnerships
Students can pursue study abroad opportunities at one of the Hertie School's nearly 40 academic partners worldwide.

The Hertie School has established dual degree programs: with the MPP Programme at the School of Public Affairs at Sciences Po in Paris, the School of International and Public Affairs (SIPA) at Columbia University in New York City, the MGA and MPA programmes at Munk School of Global Affairs and Public Policy in Toronto, the MPP Program at the University of Tokyo, the MPA Programme at the London School of Economics and Political Science (LSE), the Programme in Government and International Organizations at Bocconi University in Milan and the Atlantis dual degree with the Maxwell School at Syracuse University.

Apart from the dual degree programmes, students also have the option to spend an exchange semester at the Georgetown Public Policy Institute (GPPI) at Georgetown University, the Lee Kuan Yew School of Public Policy at the National University of Singapore, the Terry Sanford Institute of Public Policy at Duke University, the Munk School of Global Affairs at the University of Toronto, the Maxwell School of Citizenship and Public Affairs at Syracuse University, the LBJ School of Public Affairs at the University of Texas at Austin, the School of Public Policy & Management at Tsinghua University, the Graduate School of Public Policy, University of Tokyo, Trachtenberg School of Public Policy and Public Administration at The George Washington University, American University School of Public Affairs at American University and the Graduate Institute of International and Development Studies in Geneva.

The Hertie School also has partnerships in the Berlin education landscape: with the WZB Berlin Social Science Center, the Freie Universität Berlin (FU), the Humboldt-Universität zu Berlin (HU), the ESMT European School of Management and Technology, and the University of Potsdam.

It is also member of the Open Society University Network (OSUN). The school is a member of the  Association of Professional Schools of International Affairs (APSIA), whose members include the international affairs schools of leading North American universities and graduate schools in Europe and Asia. It is also part of the CIVICA network, a university alliance founded by the Hertie School and seven other institutions from England, France, Hungary, Italy, Romania and Sweden and funded by the European Commission.

Furthermore, the Hertie School is a member of key political science and policy analysis associations. These include the European Consortium for Political Science Research (ECPR), the American Political Science Association (APSA), and the Association of Professional Schools of International Affairs (APSIA), PolicyNet, and the Global Public Policy Network (GPPN).

References

External links

 Hertie School website
 Governance Report (flagship annual academic publication) website
 newspaper article: Der Tagesspiegel, 6 June 2014: 10 Jahre Hertie School of Governance: Aus Berlins Mitte in die Welt
Hertie Foundation

 
Public administration schools
Public policy research
Public policy schools
Schools of international relations
Research institutes in Germany
Social science institutes
Private universities and colleges in Germany
Universities and colleges in Berlin
Educational institutions established in 2003
2003 establishments in Germany
Research institutes established in 2003